is a former Japanese voice actress employed by 81 Produce.

Notable voice roles
Chitose Fujinomiya in Goldfish Warning!
Alice Knox in Power Dolls
Ayeka Masaki Jurai in Tenchi Muyo!
Ayeka Takada (OVA)/Romio (TV), Ghost Girl (TV; episode 8) in Pretty Sammy
Etsuko in Hanappe Bazooka
Flare in Reyon Densetsu Flair
Hatsuho Kazami in Please Teacher!
Hiroe Ogawa in F3 (anime) (uncredited)
Keikounitten Ruuan in Mamotte Shugogetten
Saeko in Twin Dolls
Ash in Demon Beast Invasion
Kayo in Demon Beast Invasion
Megumi in Urotsukidoji
Nurse in Urotsukidoji
Yumi in Urotsukidoji
Alector in Urotsukidoji
Midori in Adventure Kid
Charlotte Flowers in Majokko Tsukune-chan
Jennifer Portman in This Ugly Yet Beautiful World
Midori-sensei in Ranma ½
Noriko Okamachi/Sailor Ojo (ep 178) in Sailor Stars
Shelley Godwin in Xenosaga
Shikijou Saori in Mahoromatic
Yoshinaga-sensei in Crayon Shin-chan
Yumi in Immoral Sisters
Etoile in Tensai Terebi-kun MAX

Tokusatsu
Bee Lord/Apis Mellitus (ep. 22 - 23) in Kamen Rider Agito
Terabiter (ep. 11 - 12) in Kamen Rider Ryuki
Hexanoid: Hanabikinikibinas in Bakuryu Sentai Abaranger DELUXE: Abare Summer is Freezing Cold!

Dubbing
American Psycho (Courtney Rawlinson (Samantha Mathis))

References

External links
Yumi Takada at the Seiyuu database
 
81 Produce

1961 births
81 Produce voice actors
Japanese video game actresses
Japanese voice actresses
Living people
Voice actresses from Tokyo
20th-century Japanese actresses
21st-century Japanese actresses